Andrea Rica Taboada (born December 7, 1984) is a female taekwondo practitioner from Spain.

References

1984 births
Spanish female taekwondo practitioners
Living people
Universiade medalists in taekwondo
Universiade silver medalists for Spain
World Taekwondo Championships medalists
European Taekwondo Championships medalists
Medalists at the 2005 Summer Universiade
20th-century Spanish women
21st-century Spanish women